Mohawk is an unincorporated community census-designated place (CDP) in Keweenaw County in the U.S. state of Michigan. The community is located within Allouez Township. As an unincorporated community, Mohawk has no legally defined boundaries or population statistics of its own but does have its own post office with the 49950 ZIP Code. The ZIP Code includes most of mainland Keweenaw County and also uses the Eagle Harbor and Eagle River designations.

Mohawk is centered along U.S. Highway 41 just north of the village of Ahmeek in the Keweenaw Peninsula. It is the site of the Mohawk Mining Company, which conducted copper mining in the early 1900s. Mohawkite is a rare mineral that is believed to be found only in the Mohawk Mine.

Demographics

References

Unincorporated communities in Michigan
Unincorporated communities in Keweenaw County, Michigan
Census-designated places in Michigan
Census-designated places in Keweenaw County, Michigan